David R. Bolton (27 April 1937 – 21 January 2021) was an English professional rugby league footballer who played in the 1950s, 1960s and 1970s, who later became a coach in Australia's NSWRFL premiership. An international representative for Great Britain whose usual position was in the halves, Bolton is one of a handful of Britons to win championships both in his home country and in Australia.

Playing career

Britain
Later that season Bolton played stand-off in Wigan's 13–9 victory over Workington Town in the 1958 Challenge Cup Final at Wembley Stadium, London, on Saturday 10 May 1958, in front of a crowd of 66,109, and played stand-off, and scored a try in the 30–13 victory over Hull F.C. in the 1959 Challenge Cup Final  at Wembley on Saturday 9 May 1959, in front of a crowd of 79,811.

He also featured in the club's 1960 Championship Final win.  During the 1959–60 Kangaroo tour Bolton played for Great Britain at stand-off in all three Ashes series Test matches. During the 1963–64 Kangaroo tour Bolton again played for Great Britain at stand-off in the first and third Ashes series Test matches.

Australia
Bolton also played in Australia for the Sydney club Balmain. With them he reached the 1966 NSWRFL season's grand final against St George. Bolton played at number 7 in his sides loss against the all-conquering Dragons team of the era. As Balmain had gone through the first half of the 1966 season undefeated, they earned the right to play the Great Britain touring team. With Bolton playing no small part, Balmain defeated Great Britain. He featured in the 1969 season's Grand Final-winning Balmain team. This made him only the second Englishman to play in a grand final-winning team in Australia.  Bolton retired from playing in 1970 after being unable to keep his first grade spot in 1970.  He is often remembered as a prolific kicker of drop goals, at a time when they were worth 2 points. He was a great drop goal kicking asset to the club, he kicked 21 drop goals for Balmain during his era, some of them long range, and many of the drop goals were the difference between Balmain winning and losing.

Later life
After retiring, Bolton remained in Australia.  He coached Sydney club Parramatta for the 1973 and 1974 NSWRFL seasons.  He went on to serve as assistant coach to Tim Sheens at Penrith in the mid-1980s.  He also worked as a sports commentator and writer.

Bolton was inducted into the Balmain Tigers' Hall of Fame in 2005.  Three years later, he was retrospectively conferred the Clive Churchill Medal for his performance in the 1969 Grand Final.  He died on 21 January 2021 at the age of 83, after suffering a long illness.

References

External links
Statistics  at nrlstats.com
Statistics  at stats.rleague.com
Statistics at wigan.rlfans.com
Video 'Rugby League Final 1963' at britishpathe.com

1937 births
2021 deaths
Balmain Tigers players
Blackpool Borough players
English rugby league coaches
English rugby league players
Great Britain national rugby league team players
Lancashire rugby league team players
Parramatta Eels coaches
Rugby league five-eighths
Rugby league fullbacks
Rugby league players from Wigan
Wigan Warriors players